Lepidopalpus is a monotypic moth genus in the subfamily Lymantriinae. Its only species, Lepidopalpus hyalina, is found in southern Africa. Both the genus and the species were first described by Anthonie Johannes Theodorus Janse in 1915.

References

Lymantriinae
Monotypic moth genera